The Byers Peak Wilderness is a U.S. Wilderness Area located in Arapaho National Forest in north central Colorado. The  wilderness was established in 1993 and named after its highest point, Byers Peak. Byers Peak was named after William N. Byers, the first mayor of Hot Sulphur Springs and the founder of Colorado's first newspaper, the Rocky Mountain News.

References

Wilderness areas of Colorado
Protected areas established in 1993
Protected areas of Grand County, Colorado
Arapaho National Forest
1993 establishments in Colorado